Siphandone Lothalath (born 19 November 1993) is a Laotian professional basketball player. He currently plays for the Dunkin' Raptors club of the Thailand Basketball League.

He represented Laos’ national basketball team at several international tournaments. 
At the 2017 Southeast Asian Games in Kuala Lumpur, Malaysia, he was Laos’ top scorer in the game against Myanmar and helped secure a 78-60 victory.

References

External links
 Asia-basket.com profile

1993 births
Living people
Shooting guards
Laotian men's basketball players
Competitors at the 2017 Southeast Asian Games
Southeast Asian Games competitors for Laos